Themes for Young Lovers is a 1963 album by Percy Faith and His Orchestra. It was released in 1963 by Columbia Records (catalog no. CL2023). It debuted on Billboard magazine's pop album chart on June 29, 1963, peaked at the No. 12 spot, and remained on the chart for 13 weeks.

AllMusic gave the album a rating of three-and-a-half stars. Reviewer Eugene Chadbourne wrote: "Generously buoyed by tunes from the best known pop hitmaking teams of the late '50s and early '60s, this selection grooves along with a rhythmic bounce all its own."

Track listing
Side A
 "I Will Follow You"
 "End of the World"
 "Rhythm of the Rain"
 "Go Away Little Girl"
 "Amy"
 "On Broadway"

Side B
 "Up on the Roof"
 "Can't Get Used to Losing You"
 "Our Day Will Come"
 "All Alone Am I"
 "My Coloring Book"
 "Theme for Young Lovers"
 "Guinevere"

References

1963 albums
Columbia Records albums
Percy Faith albums